Manfred "Manny" Seissler (German: Manfred Seißler) (born August 8, 1939) is a former soccer player who began his career in the lower German divisions before moving to the United States.  He played one season in the National Professional Soccer League and seven in the North American Soccer League.  Born in Germany, he earned one cap with the U.S. national team in 1973.

Club career

Germany
Born in Germany, Seissler began his career in 1960 with the KSV Hessen Kassel junior team.  In 1961, he moved to the first team which competed in the Oberliga Süd, the southern conference of the German first division back then, which preceded the creation of the Bundesliga.  In 1963, he moved to Regionalliga Süd (Second Division) club 1. FC Pforzheim. In 1965, he moved to SV Eintracht Trier 05 of the Second Division.

United States
In 1967, he left Germany for the United States where he signed with the Pittsburgh Phantoms of the National Professional Soccer League.  The NPSL merged with the United Soccer Association in 1968 to form the first incarnation of the North American Soccer League (NASL).  The Phantoms folded and Seissler signed with the Kansas City Spurs.  With the Spurs he won the NASL championship of 1969 and Seissler played with them, in the end as captain, until they folded following the 1970 season.  

He then transferred to the Rochester Lancers.  While with Rochester, Seissler participated in the first NASL-sanctioned indoor tournament in 1971. He scored one goal and one assist in two matches and was named to the all-tournament team. In 1973, the Lancers traded Seissler to the Montreal Olympique but it folded at the end of the season and Seissler returned to the Lancers for the 1974 season.  He played only one game, then retired.  During his early years in the NASL, Seissler was one of the league's top forwards, being named a first team All Star in 1969, 1970 and 1971. In 1977, he was named to the Rochester Lancers Team of the Decade. Seissler was named to the Lancers Wall of Fame in 2017.

International career
Seissler earned one cap with the U.S. national team in a 4–0 loss to Poland on March 20, 1973.  He started the game, but came off for Siegfried Stritzl in the 58th minute.

References

External links
 American stats
 Rochester Lancers Wall of Fame

1939 births
Living people
1. FC Pforzheim players
American Soccer League (1933–1983) players
American expatriate sportspeople in Canada
American expatriate soccer players
American soccer players
SV Eintracht Trier 05 players
Expatriate soccer players in Canada
Expatriate soccer players in the United States
Association football forwards
West German expatriate sportspeople in Canada
German footballers
German emigrants to the United States
Kansas City Spurs players
KSV Hessen Kassel players
Montreal Olympique players
National Professional Soccer League (1967) players
North American Soccer League (1968–1984) players
North American Soccer League (1968–1984) indoor players
Pittsburgh Phantoms players
Rochester Lancers (1967–1980) players
Syracuse Scorpions players
United States men's international soccer players
West German expatriate footballers
West German expatriate sportspeople in the United States
West German footballers
Player-coaches
North American Soccer League (1968–1984) coaches